Khandagatay (Khandagata) is a rural locality (a selo) in Tarbagataysky District, Republic of Buryatia, Russia. The population was 286 as of 2010. There are 4 streets.

Geography 
Khandagatay is located 38 km southwest of Tarbagatay (the district's administrative centre) by road. Barykino-Klyuchi is the nearest rural locality.

References 

Rural localities in Tarbagataysky District